Pavlohrad is a city and municipality in central east Ukraine, located within the Dnipropetrovsk Oblast. It serves as the administrative center of Pavlohrad Raion.

The rivers of Vovcha (runs through the city  towards the Samara River), Hnizdka, Kocherha flow through Pavlohrad. There are 20 schools and 1 lyceum in the city.

History 
Pavlohrad, one of the oldest modern settlements in the Dnipropetrovsk oblast appears in documents from the 17th century.

At the beginning of the 1770s,  Zaporozhian Cossack Matvii Khizhnyak built winter quarters, which soon became known as sloboda Matviivka. In 1779, Matveevka was renamed to Luhanske,  as the latter became headquarters of the Luhansk pikemen regiment headed by M. I. Golinishchev-Kutuzov. With the establishment of Yekaterinoslav Viceroyalty in 1783, Pavlohrad, re-named in honor of the future Emperor Paul І, became a part of this administrative unit as a district town. In 1784, Pavlohrad received city status.

There were 426 homes and 2419 inhabitants in the city at the end of 18th century. The citizens of Pavlohrad lived in wattle and daub huts. The first stone building was the Svyato-Vosnesensky Cathedral on Soborna ploshcha (Eng.: cathedral square). The first  coat of arms of the city was affirmed on July 29, 1811, the second one on September 26, 1979. The first citizens were  Cossacks of Samarsky and Kalmiussky Palanki and  demobilized military. The city plan by Scottish architect W. Geste was affirmed by emperor Nicholas I on July 31, 1831.

In 1871, local merchant A.K. Shalin was elected the first head of the city. The central street was named after him (ul. Shalinskaya, (eng: Shalinsky street) later renamed ul. Lenina, (eng.: Lenin street)). (In 2015, the  Ukrainian government approved  laws that outlawed communist symbols and street names.)  the street is named "Soborna". Merchant of ІІ Guild A.V. Permanin was elected as city governor in 1892. Under his leadership the city started to develop rapidly: several churches, temples, barracks, gymnasiums, factories and plants were built.

In the 1870s, a railway connecting St. Petersburg and Simferopol passed through Pavlohrad. In 1896, the Golenishchev-Kutuzov family built the "Earl's Theatre".

In 1930, an uprising against Soviet rule took place in Pavlohrad. From 1780 to 1941, a significant Jewish community existed in the city. The pre-Holocaust Jewish population was approximately 4,000. The city was destroyed in 1941 during the Nazi occupation. During the Holocaust the German occupying forces operated a concentration camp (Dulag 111) and a Jewish ghetto in Pavlohrad. A large part of the community died during the war and during the mass executions. The Pavlohrad Jewish cemetery contains not only Jewish, but also Christian burials, which the leaders of the local Jewish community agreed to in 1995. On May 22, 2011, it was reported that unknown persons had desecrated the cemetery in the town - tombstones were turned over and broken in an apparently anti-Semitic act.

Until 18 July 2020, Pavlohrad was incorporated as a city of oblast significance and served as the administrative center of Pavlohrad Raion though it did not belong to the raion. In July 2020, as part of the administrative reform of Ukraine, which reduced the number of raions of Dnipropetrovsk Oblast to seven, the city of Pavlohrad was merged into Pavlohrad Raion.

During the 2022 Russian invasion of Ukraine, Pavlohrad — an important railway transportation hub — was  subjected to Russian attacks. On 22 March, a missile strike destroyed the Pavlohrad-2 train station in the city, killing at least one person.

Pavlohrad Mechanical Plant
The city is home to Pavlohrad Mechanical Plant (PMZ) that was established in December 1963 as a specialized production facility of the Plant no. 586 (now Pivdenmash Production Association). PMZ is a factory dedicated to assembly, perfection and production of solid-fueled rocket engines and missiles. By 1975 PMZ became the largest solid-rocket factory within the Ministry of General Machine Building of USSR. PMZ made fuel tanks for booster rockets and plastic ICBM rocket motor casings; parts, components, and assemblies for aerospace systems manufacturing.

Gallery

International relations

Twin towns — Sister cities
Pavlohrad is twinned with:

  Lubsko, Poland  
  San Sebastián, Spain

References

External links
 The murder of the Jews of Pavlohrad during World War II, at Yad Vashem website.

 
Cities in Dnipropetrovsk Oblast
Pavlogradsky Uyezd
Cities of regional significance in Ukraine
Populated places established in the Russian Empire
Holocaust locations in Ukraine